Albina Felski (1916–1996) was a Canadian–American self-taught folk artist. Her work is included in the collections of the Smithsonian American Art Museum and the Smart Museum of Art.

References

1916 births
1996 deaths
20th-century American women artists
20th-century Canadian women artists
Artists from British Columbia
Canadian emigrants to the United States